Larry Ryans (born July 28, 1971) is a former American football wide receiver. He played for the Tampa Bay Buccaneers in 1996 and for the Los Angeles Xtreme in 2001.

References

1971 births
Living people
American football wide receivers
Clemson Tigers football players
Detroit Lions players
Carolina Panthers players
Tampa Bay Buccaneers players
Rhein Fire players
Los Angeles Xtreme players